Arabella Scott (7 May 1886 – 27 August 1980) was a Scottish teacher, suffragette and campaigner. As a member of the Women's Freedom League (WFL) she took a petition to Downing Street in July 1909. She subsequently adopted more militant tactics with the Women's Social and Political Union (WSPU). She was one of a group who attempted arson at Kelso racecourse in May 1913. She was arrested many times and went on hunger strikes when she was sent to jail. Whilst in Perth Prison in 1914, she was force-fed for an extraordinarily long time under the supervision of Dr Hugh Ferguson Watson. She was released under the controversial Cat and Mouse Act. WSPU activism ceased when the First World War began and Scott later emigrated to Australia. She wrote about her experiences in her autobiography A Murky Past.

Early life 
Arabella Charlotte Scott was born on 7 May 1886 in Dunoon, Scotland. Her mother was a teacher and her father served as a captain in the British army for more than 25 years.

She graduated with an MA from the University of Edinburgh and went on to become a school teacher, living with her family in Edinburgh. Arabella and her sisters were advocates for women's suffrage and were active speakers in Scotland for the cause.

Campaigning for women's suffrage 
In 1909, Arabella and her sister Muriel were both arrested on the charge of obstruction in London after they tried to hand a petition to the British Prime Minister H. H. Asquith, on this charge the sisters served 21 days at HM Prison Holloway.

Arabella Scott was arrested and released several times over the following years, under the Prisoners (Temporary Discharge for Ill Health) Act 1913, known by suffragettes as the Cat and Mouse Act. The Act was brought in so that suffragettes could not die in prison due to hunger strikes, instead when they became too weak they were released and then re-arrested at a later time to complete their sentences. On the 6 April 1913, she was arrested again, for trying to set fire to a racecourse stand at Kelso Racecourse along with  Agnes and Elizabeth Thomson, Edith Hudson, and Donald McEwan. Following their trial, on 19 May 1913, Arabella Scott, Edith Hudson and Donald McEwan were sentenced to nine months, Elizabeth Thompson, three months, and Agnes was released. They were imprisoned at Calton Gaol and the women went on hunger strike. Scott was released under the Cat and Mouse Act on 24 May but when her licence ran out she failed to return to Calton Gaol.

Scott was caught on 12 June 1913 and rearrested, when she returned to Calton Gaol she went on hunger strike again. On the 16 June she was assessed as too weak by a medical officer and was released on licence but did not return to the jail. Scott was found in London on the 24 August and returned to Calton Gaol where she went on hunger and thirst strike. On 28 August the medical officer put her forward for immediate discharge due to her health, however she had to be removed from the jail by force as she did not want to be placed on leave under licence once more. The licence expired on 10 September 1913, Scott was not found until the following year.

Scott continued to work as an organiser for the Women's Social and Political Union in the Brighton branch under the name, 'Catherine Reid', she was found in May 1914 and resisted arrest. Scotland Yard and the Brighton Police both had to help the police that had come from Scotland to arrest Scott as she refused to walk and had to be lifted and dragged onto trains. She started her hunger and thirst strike on 2 May when she was arrested, and by 8 May was ill and allowed to leave the Calton Gaol under licence. On 17 May Scott departed for London so that she could help the WSPU campaign against the liberal candidate in the Ipswich by-election. She was due to return to jail on 22 May. She was found on 19 June during a raid at a suffragette house, where she was rearrested and forced to return to jail.

Scott was given a Hunger Strike Medal 'for Valour' by WSPU.

Force-feeding at Perth prison 
Scott was taken to Perth Prison on 20 June and released on 26 July 1914. Despite an appeal to prison authorities by Janie Allan on her behalf, warning of dangerous protests during a royal visit if Scott was force-fed, she suffered this throughout her imprisonment three times a day. She was not allowed visitors or letters during her imprisonment.

In her autobiography, My Murky Past, compiled and edited by her niece, Frances Wheelhouse, from taped interviews, Scott described a force-feeding tube being driven into her stomach as bits of her broken teeth washed around with blood in her mouth. When she vomited after it was removed, Watson would shout at her "You did that on purpose". Scott also recalled that one day Watson had said to her, "Look here, it's a pity, why don't you give it all away? The government would send you over to Canada and I would personally conduct you there." She replied, "That would be tantamount to saying that all this protest of mine was in vain and wrong and I would be giving in."

Scott was once more released under licence under the Cat and Mouse Act. Her sister Muriel gathered a crowd of 3,000 people outside the prison to protest. Scott was released on 26 June 1914, two days before Archduke Franz Ferdinand was assassinated and the First World War began, with the UK joining by declaring war on Germany on 4 August. The WSPU announced a truce on militant acts, the Secretary of Scotland announced on 10 August the mitigation of all suffragette sentences passed in Scottish courts including Scott's.

A fictional account based on Arabella Scott's ordeal has since been dramatised by the playwright, Ajay Close, who researched the play based on Watson's reports held in the National Archives of Scotland and from the select transcripts of taped interviews with Arabella Scott, provided by Frances Wheelhouse.

Later life 
Scott, under her married name Colville-Reeves, emigrated to Australia.

She died on 27 August 1980, and her memorial is in the Palmdale Lawn Cemetery on the Central Coast of New South Wales.

See also 
 Suffragette
 Women's suffrage in the United Kingdom
 Frances Gordon
 Fanny Parker
Maude Edwards

References 

1886 births
1980 deaths
Scottish suffragists
Alumni of the University of Edinburgh
People from Dunoon
Scottish women activists
British women's rights activists
Women's Social and Political Union
Hunger Strike Medal recipients